Kyiv Interbank Offer Rate (KIBOR) is a daily indicative rate based on the interest rates at which banks offer to lend unsecured funds to other banks on the Ukrainian money market (or interbank market). KIBOR is the opposite of the Kyiv Interbank Bid Rate (KIBID).

KIBOR is currently calculated for such currencies as: Ukrainian Hryvnia (UAH) and US Dollar (USD).

Reference rates
Finance in Ukraine